is an anime created by Tatsunoko Productions. A prehistoric boy, his family and a chunk of land from the past, were accidentally brought to the present time by a scientist's time-travel experiments.

References

External links
 

1968 anime television series debuts
Comedy anime and manga
Fuji TV original programming
Science fiction anime and manga
Tatsunoko Production
Japanese time travel television series
Fictional prehistoric characters